Gladstone is a New Jersey Transit station in Peapack-Gladstone, Somerset County, New Jersey, United States. It is the western terminus of the Gladstone Branch of the Morris and Essex line. A yard is to the east of the station.

The original 1891 wood station and freight station remains in service. The head house has been on the state and federal registers of historic places since 1984, listed as part of the Operating Passenger Railroad Stations Thematic Resource.

Station layout
The station has a 4-car high-level side platform and ADA ramp.

See also
List of New Jersey Transit stations
National Register of Historic Places listings in Somerset County, New Jersey

References

External links

NJ Transit Rail Operations stations
Railway stations in the United States opened in 1890
Railway stations on the National Register of Historic Places in New Jersey
Former Delaware, Lackawanna and Western Railroad stations
Railway stations in Somerset County, New Jersey
National Register of Historic Places in Somerset County, New Jersey
New Jersey Register of Historic Places